The PSA XU is a family of internal combustion engines used in Citroën and Peugeot automobiles. It became the dominant mid-size engine in Peugeot and Citroën products through the 1980s and 1990s.

The XU design was introduced in 1981 with the Peugeot 305. It was a SOHC or DOHC straight-4 design with two or four valves per cylinder, using petrol as fuel. It was applied transversely in front wheel drive vehicles only, tilted by 30°. The engine uses an aluminium cylinder head in all models. All models' blocks are made, except XU10, in cast aluminium alloy with removable cast iron wet cylinder liners. XU10 blocks are made in cast iron, with bores machined directly in the block, without removable cylinder liners. Its first Citroën application was on the Citroën BX in 1982, where it appeared in  format.

The XU was replaced by the more modern EW/DW family.

XU5

All XU5 engines were SOHC 2-valve per cylinder designs. They used either a single or double-barrel carburetor, or fuel injection, depending on model.

XU7
All XU7 engines used fuel injection, with a 16-valve DOHC version, the XU7 JP4, also produced.

XU8
The only engine in this family is the 16-valve DOHC turbocharged XU8 T which was fitted to the Peugeot 205 Turbo 16.

XU9
The XU9 was the predecessor to the XU10 and had an aluminum block with wet iron liners. Many versions were produced, from a double-barrel carburetted 8-valve to a 16-valve DOHC fuel injected model.

XU10
Many versions were produced, from a double-barrel carburetted 8-valve to a 16-valve DOHC, fuel injected, turbocharged model.

Motorsport
The XU engine was used in motorsport for over 3 decades.

See also
 PSA XUD (Diesel variant)
 List of PSA engines

Sources

Guide des moteurs Peugeot Citroën (in French)

XU
Straight-four engines
Gasoline engines by model